The Battletoads (named Rash, Pimple and Zitz; also collectively known as the 'Toads) are the titular player characters in the Battletoads video game series, introduced in the original Battletoads in 1991. They are a trio of anthropomorphic, mutant toad space warriors fighting against the wicked Dark Queen's forces to save the universe. They also appeared in some other media and have gained a sizable fan following.

Appearances

In the Battletoads games
According to the games' backstory, the Battletoads were originally human computer technicians and roommates. The trio tested the original Battletoads game by playing the game as the 'Toads in a sort of virtual reality simulation. They became suspicious of both their boss and chief game programmer Silas Volkmire and decided to investigate the office at night. Upon finding the video game unit turned on, they tested it to see if it had been tampered with. This was a trap and they were transported to another planet, permanently transformed into the Battletoads. When the evil Dark Queen attempted to destroy the 'Toads upon their arrival, they fought their way to freedom with the assistance of Professor T. Bird, who became the 'Toads' friend and mentor. The 'Toads then decided to never rest until the Dark Queen is defeated once and for all.

Each Battletoad has the ability to fight enemies with punches and kicks, as well as transform their limbs into different objects. They can also use various objects as weapons and pilot machines.

Rash 
Rash (Dave Shar) is the "cool cat" of the 'Toads. He is an extrovert and a show-off and loves to crack puns. Rash is the smallest but the fastest and most agile of the 'Toads. He always wears his trademark sunglasses and spiked black kneepads. In early artwork he was presented wearing red armbands, but these armbands were never visible in any of the games, and by Battletoads/Double Dragon the armbands had been eliminated entirely, though they were restored in his Killer Instinct appearance. His profile in Battletoads Arcade reveals his height to be 6' 3". Rash's skin has changed in appearance once at the beginning of the series. He began with a medium shade of green, just like the other two 'Toads, and appears that way on the original game's box art for the NES (with dark spots in the Sega Genesis version). In every game he appears in, his skin is a bright green. In the 2020 reboot, Rash is depicted as the most self-important member of the team, seeking fame and recognition for their heroics.

Rash has appeared in every Battletoads game, though not always as a playable character. He was player one's character in the original Battletoads game but was out of action in Battletoads for the Game Boy due to being kidnapped prior to the game's opening. He returned to action as player two's character in Battletoads in Battlemaniacs and continued on as a playable character in Battletoads/Double Dragon and Battletoads Arcade.

Pimple 
Pimple (George Pie) is the muscle of the 'Toads and prefers to fight instead of talk. Pimple is the largest and strongest 'Toad. He wears spiked black kneepads and spiked black arm braces. Early artwork depicted him wearing a spiked black belt, but he was never seen wearing this belt in any of the games and later artwork eliminated the belt. According to his profile in the arcade Battletoads, he stands at a height of 7'4". Pimple's skin has changed in appearance a few times over the course of the series. He began with a medium shade of green, just like the other two 'Toads, and appears that way on the original box art. In the first game itself his skin was a darker shade of green, matching Rash but not Zitz. His skin was later changed to a light tan before finally being presented with a brown color for his skin, which is now considered his official skin color. He appears with his current color in Battletoads/Double Dragon and Battletoads Arcade. In the 2020 reboot, Pimple is the most easygoing and peaceful of the team, contrasting his muscular appearance, but is prone to violent outbursts when pushed too far.

Pimple has appeared in every Battletoads game, but not always as a playable character. He was out of action in both the original Battletoads game and Battletoads for the Game Boy, having been kidnapped prior to the start of both games. His first appearance as a playable character was in Battletoads in Battlemaniacs in which he was player one's character. He continued to be a playable character in Battletoads/Double Dragon and Battletoads Arcade and is immediately selectable in both games.

Zitz 
Zitz (Morgan Ziegler) is the leader of the 'Toads. He is a tactical genius and an economical fighter, preferring fighting methods that allow him to conserve his strength. Zitz has a larger build and is slightly taller than Rash. He is always seen wearing black gauntlets (the arcade Battletoads revealed his gauntlets to contain video communication hardware), spiked black kneepads and a black belt with the 'Toads' insignia on the buckle. According to his profile in the arcade Battletoads, he stands at a height of 6' 8". Zitz's skin has changed in appearance several times over the course of the series. He began with a medium shade of green, just like the other two 'Toads, and appears that way on the original box art. In the first game itself his skin was actually tan to tell him apart from Player 1 (Rash). His skin was later changed to a lighter green with hints of yellow (he appeared to be an olive green in Battletoads in Battlemaniacs), before he was finally presented with a cool bluish-green color for his skin in Battletoads/Double Dragon and Battletoads Arcade. In the 2020 reboot, Zitz acts as the leader and brains of the team, though this causes him to suffer from a superiority complex as a result.

Zitz has appeared in every Battletoads game, though not always as a playable character. He was player two's character in the original Battletoads game and took on the Dark Queen's army solo in Battletoads for the Game Boy. Due to a surprise ambush he was knocked unconscious and taken prisoner just prior to the beginning of Battletoads in Battlemaniacs and thus was not playable in that game. He returned to action in Battletoads/Double Dragon and Battletoads Arcade and is immediately selectable in both games.

In other media
A Battletoads cartoon series was pitched to networks, but only a pilot episode was ever produced, written by David Wise. In the pilot, the trio are junior high school teenagers who are video game enthusiasts and self-described "biggest losers in the universe". Suddenly, Professor T. Bird and Princess Angelica from the Planet Cagellian emerge from the arcade game star Wars. Angelica asks them to become "the most legendary warriors in the universe" and join her, and Professor T. Bird then uses his "toad essence" to transform "the three nerds" into the Battletoads against the arriving Dark Queen and her forces. At the end of the fight, Angelica gives them their Battletoads names. A comic preview of the pilot by Francis Mao was printed in GamePro magazine. 

All three Battletoads also appear in a few comic strips published in Nintendo Power. They make a guest appearance in the Xbox One and PC versions of the 2014 platform game Shovel Knight.

The Battletoads appear in Ready Player One. They are among the avatars that take part in the Battle of Castle Anorak.

Rash alone appears as a guest character in the 2016 fighting game Killer Instinct: Season Three. He has the ability to use several of his abilities from the Battletoads games, including his run, smash hits, and a speeder bike. He was made available in Killer Instinct to all Rare Replay owners for a limited test period prior to the official public launch of Season Three.

Reception

The Battletoads have been well-received, achieving an iconic status during the early 1990s. According to Computer and Video Games article "Toads V Turtles" in 1991, "There's no doubt about it - the Toads have moved into Turtle territory a big way, and seem certain to give our pizza munching heroes a serious run for their money." That same year, Raze declared: "In the US, the Battletoads are to Nintendo what Christian Slater is to film. These green-backs are the coolest, raddest, most laidback creatures to ever appear on the streets. Put simply, these guys make the Turtles look like pond scum." Pimple was included in GamesRadar's 2015 list of "the '90s raddest gaming mascots" as one of the era's "brightest stars".

Retrospectively, the Battletoads were dubbed the "least terrible Teenage Mutant Ninja Turtles rip-off" by Topless Robot in 2008. In 2011, Complex included their boot-to-the-face finishing move the fourth craziest video game Fatality, adding that "inventing the curb stomp LONG before Edward Norton in American History X, the Battletoads [...] may have been knock-offs of the Ninja Turtles, but they definitely kicked more ass." That same year, Complex ranked them at fifth place on the list of "really ugly good guys", adding that "even their names are ugly." In 2012, the Battletoads placed have been at the 81st spot on GamesRadar's list of top 100 "most memorable, influential, and badass protagonists in games". According to Game Revolution, "they'll be remembered as much for their loving-yet-irrational fanboys."

In 2008, Joystiq stated they would not mind seeing one of the Battletoads in a Super Smash Bros. game, while GamesRadar featured them among the "game characters that time forgot" yet "deserved more." Pocket Gamer included the Battletoads among the top ten forgotten handheld video game characters in 2011, adding that "these guys could have been legendary superstars featuring in mediocre CG movies today. Instead, they are consigned to limbo." In 2012, 411mania.com similarly listed them among the video game characters "that need comebacks". EventHubs readers voted Rash a character they would most like to see as a guest fighter in the new Killer Instinct game in 2013.

See also 
 List of anthropomorphic animal superheroes

References

Animal characters in video games
Animal superheroes
Anthropomorphic amphibians
Anthropomorphic video game characters
 
Corporate mascots 
Fictional frogs
Fictional programmers
Fictional trios
Male characters in advertising
Male characters in video games
Microsoft protagonists
Mutant characters in video games
Shapeshifter characters in video games
Superhero teams
Video game characters introduced in 1991
Video game characters with superhuman strength
Video game mascots 
Nobility characters in video games
Video game superheroes